Inder Thakur (c. 1950 – 23 June 1985) was an Indian actor, fashion designer, and model who also worked as a purser on Air India. He had married a woman named Priya, and had a child with her. He won the 1985 International Fashion Designer award during the World Modeling Association convention in New York City in May of that year. He died at age 35, along with Priya and their child, in the bombing of Air India Flight 182. He was the youngest son of actor Hiralal.

Filmography
 Nadiya Ke Paar (1982) – Elder brother of Sachin
''Tulsi (1985) Movie – Ganesh Singh

References

External links
 

1985 deaths
Male actors in Hindi cinema
Air India Flight 182
Mass murder victims
Victims of aviation accidents or incidents in Ireland
20th-century Indian male actors
People murdered in Ireland
Indian people murdered abroad
Terrorism victims in India
Victims of Sikh terrorism
Victims of aviation accidents or incidents in 1985